Voleri is a neighbourhood of Riga, the capital of Latvia.

Neighbourhoods in Riga